Cleage is a surname. Notable people with the surname include:

Albert Cleage (1911–2000), American Congregationalist minister, political organizer, and author
Pearl Cleage (born 1948), African-American author
Ralph Cleage (1898–1977), American baseball player

See also
Cleare